Anindita is a given name. Notable people with the name include: 

 Anindita Bose (born 1986), Bengali actress
 Anindita Ghosh, British historian
 Anindita Nayar (born 1988), Indian actress
 Anindita Paul (born 1975), Indian singer
 Anindita Raychaudhury, Bengali actress